The Edward Ransom Farmstead, Livestock and Equipment Barn was a historic agricultural outbuilding in rural White County, Arkansas.  It was located on the Ransom Farmstead, a few miles south of Midway, on the west side of United States Route 167.  It was a -story structure, built in part out of logs and in part out of wood framing.  Its principal form was derived from three log cribs, joined by saddle- and V-notching, a form not seen anywhere else in the county.  It was built about 1915.

The building was listed on the National Register of Historic Places in 1992.  It has been listed as destroyed by the Arkansas Historic Preservation Program.

See also
National Register of Historic Places listings in White County, Arkansas

References

Barns on the National Register of Historic Places in Arkansas
Infrastructure completed in 1915
Demolished buildings and structures in Arkansas
National Register of Historic Places in White County, Arkansas
1915 establishments in Arkansas
Log buildings and structures on the National Register of Historic Places in Arkansas